TCA College may refer to:

TCA College (Malaysia)
TCA College (Singapore)